The Velebit Channel (or ;  or ) is a channel in Croatia located between the lands at the foot of the Velebit mountain range and the islands of Pag, Rab, Goli Otok, Prvić and Krk.

It is believed some Istro-Romanians crossed the Velebit Channel and settled in the western part of the island of Krk during the second half of the 15th century, forming a community in the island that would survive until 1875, when the last speaker of the Istro-Romanian dialect of Krk, defined by some Croatian scholars as "Krko-Romanian", died. One of the Italian names for the Velebit Channel,  ("Channel of the Morlach"), originates from these migrations.

References

External links
 

Straits of Croatia
Adriatic Sea
Straits of the Mediterranean Sea
Landforms of Primorje-Gorski Kotar County
Landforms of Lika-Senj County
Landforms of Zadar County